This is a list of ice hockey leagues, both professional and amateur, from around the world; parentheses denote year of establishment and, where applicable, year of disestablishment.

North American

Major professional
 National Hockey League (1917) (Canada; United States)

Minor professional
American Hockey League (1936) (United States; Canada)
ECHL (1988 as East Coast Hockey League) (United States; Canada)
Southern Professional Hockey League (2004) (United States)
Federal Prospects Hockey League (2010) (United States)

Semi-pro
Ligue Nord-Américaine de Hockey (1996 as Quebec Semi-Pro Hockey League) (Canada)
Liga Mexicana Élite (1989 as Mexican National Championship) (Mexico)

Junior

Major junior
Note: that the major junior level is considered professional by some authorities, including the NCAA, as its players earn a small stipend.
Canadian Hockey League (governing authority)
Ontario Hockey League (1933) (Canada; United States)
Quebec Major Junior Hockey League (1969) (Canada)
Western Hockey League (1966) (Canada; United States)

Junior A
Hockey Canada junior A leagues
Canadian Junior Hockey League (governing authority)
Alberta Junior Hockey League (1964)
Central Canada Hockey League
Quebec Junior Hockey League
Manitoba Junior Hockey League
Maritime Junior A Hockey League (1967 as Metro Valley Junior Hockey League; became a junior A league in 1977)
Northern Ontario Junior Hockey League
Ontario Junior Hockey League
Saskatchewan Junior Hockey League
Superior International Junior Hockey League
Independent
British Columbia Hockey League (1961)

USA Hockey junior leagues
Tier I
United States Hockey League (1979)

Tier II
North American Hockey League (1975)

Tier III
North American 3 Hockey League (1970) – formerly the Central States Hockey LeagueIndependent junior leagues
Can-Am Junior Hockey League (2022) - Broke away from the Western States Junior Hockey League Jan '22
Eastern Hockey League (EHL and EHL Premier) (2013) – formerly the Atlantic Junior Hockey League (2003)
Greater Metro Junior A Hockey League (2006)
Manitoba Major Junior Hockey League (1970) - sanctioned by Hockey Manitoba
United States Premier Hockey League (NCDC, Premier, and Elite) (2013) – formerly a Tier III USA Hockey junior league. The National Collegiate Development Conference (NCDC) was initially designed to be the USPHL's Tier II USA Hockey junior league but was denied sanctioning which resulted in the entire junior league to operate independently in 2017.

Junior B
Hockey Canada junior B leagues
Calgary Junior Hockey League
Capital Junior Hockey League
Capital Region Junior Hockey League Break away league from Keystone League (2018)
Eastern Ontario Junior Hockey League formerly the Central Canada Hockey League Tier 2Greater Ontario Junior Hockey League (OHA)
Heritage Junior B Hockey League
Island Junior Hockey League
Keystone Junior Hockey League formerly the Manitoba Junior B Hockey LeagueKootenay International Junior Hockey League 
Lakehead Junior Hockey League formerly the Thunder Bay Junior B Hockey LeagueLigue de Hockey de La Capitale *
Ligue de Hockey Chaudière-Appalaches Junior AA *
Ligue de Hockey Estrie-Mauricie Junior AA *
Ligue de Hockey Lac St. Louis Junior AA *
Ligue de Hockey Laurentides-Lanaudière Junior AA*
Ligue de Hockey Métropolitaine Junior AA * formerly the Richelieu Junior AA Hockey LeagueLigue de Hockey Saguenay-Lac-St-Jean Junior AA *
New Brunswick Junior B Hockey League
North Eastern Alberta Junior B Hockey League
North West Junior Hockey League
Nova Scotia Junior Hockey League
Pacific Junior Hockey League
Prairie Junior Hockey League formerly the South Saskatchewan Junior B Hockey League, merged with North Saskatchewan Junior B Hockey League
St. John's Junior Hockey League
Vancouver Island Junior Hockey League(*) Quebec Junior "AA" is roughly equal to Ontario Junior "B"Junior C
Hockey Canada junior C leagues
Calgary Junior C Hockey League
Hanover Tache Junior Hockey League
Ligue de Hockey Junior A Bois-Francs *
Ligue de Hockey Junior A Rive-Sud *
Ligue Interzone de hockey mineur BC Rive Nord (Junior A)
National Capital Junior Hockey League formerly the Eastern Ontario Junior C Hockey LeagueNew Brunswick Junior B Hockey League
Noralta Junior Hockey League
Nova Scotia Regional Junior Hockey League
Prince Edward Island Junior C Hockey League formerly the Prince Edward Island Minor Junior Hockey LeagueProvincial Junior Hockey League (OHA) 2016-17 - Merging of the 8 Southern Ontario's Jr. C Leagues
Qu’Appelle Valley Hockey League formerly the Saskatchewan Junior C Hockey League(*) Quebec Junior "A" is roughly equal to Ontario Junior "C"Junior D
Ligue Interzone de hockey mineur BC Rive Nord (Junior B) (Canada) *(*) Quebec Junior "B" is roughly equal to Ontario Junior "D"College

U Sports hockey (Canada)

U Sports (Canada, varsity)
Atlantic University Sport
Canada West Universities Athletic Association
Ontario University Athletics
Réseau du sport étudiant du Québec
Alberta Colleges Athletics Conference
British Columbia Intercollegiate Hockey League

NCAA hockey (United States)
National Collegiate Athletic Association (United States, varsity)
 Division I
 Atlantic Hockey (men only)
 Big Ten (men only)
 Central Collegiate Hockey Association (men only)
 College Hockey America (women only)
 ECAC Hockey (both genders)
 Hockey East (both genders)
 National Collegiate Hockey Conference (men only)
 New England Women's Hockey Alliance (women only)
 Western Collegiate Hockey Association (women only)
 Division II
 Northeast-10 Conference Division III
 Commonwealth Coast Conference
 Massachusetts State Collegiate Athletic Conference
 Midwest Collegiate Hockey Association
 Minnesota Intercollegiate Athletic Conference
 New England Hockey Conference
 Northern Collegiate Hockey Association
 New England Small College Athletic Conference
 State University of New York Athletic Conference
 United Collegiate Hockey Conference
 Wisconsin Intercollegiate Athletic Conference

Notes
 Two all-sports conferences, the Division I Ivy League and Division III Middle Atlantic Conference, officially sponsor ice hockey for both men and women, but neither hold conference tournaments nor compete for their own automatic bids to the NCAA tournament. All of the hockey-sponsoring schools in both leagues are members of hockey-only leagues and compete for those leagues' automatic bids, with Ivy League members competing in ECAC Hockey and MAC members competing in the United Collegiate Hockey Conference. The Ivies and MAC both extrapolate their own conference champions from results of regular-season games between their own members. 
 The Northeast-10 sponsors a championship for its members that play men's ice hockey, but the NCAA doesn't currently sponsor a national championship at Division II level for either sex. All members of that conference with women's teams participate in the NEWHA.

NAIA hockey (United States)
National Association of Intercollegiate Athletics (United States, varsity)
 Wolverine–Hoosier Athletic Conference (WHAC)
Note: there are also independent teams outside of the WHAC.

ACHA hockey (United States and Canada)
American Collegiate Hockey Association (United States; Canada)
Men's Division 1
Central States Collegiate Hockey League (CSCHL)
College Hockey Mid-America (CHMA)
Eastern Collegiate Hockey Association (ECHA)
Eastern States Collegiate Hockey League (ESCHL)
Great Lakes Collegiate Hockey League (GLCHL)
Northeast Collegiate Hockey League (NECHL)
Western Collegiate Hockey League (WCHL)
Men's Division 2
Atlantic Coast Collegiate Hockey League (ACCHL)
Colonial States College Hockey Conference (CSCHC)
Mid-American Collegiate Hockey Association (MACHA) (Gold Division)
Mid-Atlantic Collegiate Hockey Association (MACH)
Mountain West Collegiate Hockey League (MWCHL)
Northeast Collegiate Hockey Association (NECHA) (Patriot & American Conferences)
Northern Collegiate Hockey League (NCHL)
Pacific 8 Intercollegiate Hockey Conference (PAC-8)
Pacific Collegiate Hockey Association (PCHA)
Super East Collegiate Hockey League (SECHL)
Texas Collegiate Hockey Conference (TCHC)
Tri-State Collegiate Hockey League (TSCHL)
Upstate New York Club Hockey League (UNYCHL)
West Coast Hockey Conference (WCHC)
Western Collegiate Club Hockey Association (WCCHA)
Men's Division 3
Blue Ridge Hockey Conference (BRHC)
College Hockey Association (CHA) (Contains Non-ACHA members)
College Hockey East (CHE)
Delaware Valley Collegiate Hockey Conference (DVCHC)
Empire Collegiate Hockey Conference (ECHC)
Indiana Collegiate Hockey Conference (ICHC)
Mason-Dixon Collegiate Hockey Association (MDCHA)
Metropolitan Collegiate Hockey Conference (MCHC) 
Michigan Collegiate Hockey Conference (MCHC)
Mid-American Collegiate Hockey Association (MACHA) (Silver division)
North Central Collegiate Hockey Association (NCCHA)
Northeast Collegiate Hockey Association (NECHA) (Colonial Conference)
South Eastern Collegiate Hockey Conference (SECHC)
Southern Collegiate Hockey Conference (SCHC)
Women's Division 1
Central Collegiate Women's Hockey Association (CCWHA)
Eastern Collegiate Women's Hockey League (ECWHL)
Western Women's Collegiate Hockey League (WWCHL)
Women's Midwest College Hockey (WMCH)
Women's Division 2
College Hockey East (CHE)
Delaware Valley Collegiate Hockey Conference (DVCHC Women's)
Note: there are also many independent teams in all three ACHA divisions in addition to the many within the hockey conferences and leagues.

Women's
Premier Hockey Federation (2015 as National Women's Hockey League) (United States; Canada)
NCAA Division I women's ice hockey (2000)
NCAA Division III women's ice hockey
U Sports women's ice hockey (1998)
Junior Women's Hockey League (2007)
Hockey collégial féminin RSEQ (1999)
Livonia League
Mid-Atlantic Women's Hockey League (1975)
Provincial Women's Hockey League (2004)

Senior

Sanctioned by Hockey Canada or USA Hockey

Canada
Alberta
Allan Cup Hockey West (Alberta Sr. AAA) formerly the Chinook Hockey League
North Peace Hockey League (Alberta Sr. AAA)
Ontario
Allan Cup Hockey (Ontario Sr. AAA) (1953) formerly Major League Hockey
WOAA Senior AA Hockey League (Ontario Sr. AA and A) (1948) formerly the Western Ontario Athletic Association Senior Hockey League
Quebec
Ligue Centrale de Hockey (Quebec Sr. AAA/semi-pro) (1990)
Saskatchewan
Big 6 Hockey League (Saskatchewan Sr. AAA)
Highway Hockey League (Saskatchewan Sr. AAA)

United States
Great Lakes Hockey League (1937)
Mountain West Hockey League (2012)

School and youth
Central States Developmental Hockey League
Manitoba Midget 'AAA' Hockey League
United States Premier Hockey League (2013)
Ontario Minor Hockey Association
Minor Hockey Alliance Of Ontario
Greater Toronto Hockey League

High school
Delaware Scholastic Hockey Association
Capital Scholastic Hockey League (Virginia)
Interscholastic Hockey League
Massachusetts Interscholastic Athletic Association (MIAA)
Super Eight (hockey)
Midwest Prep Hockey League
Minnesota State High School League boys hockey
Missouri high school hockey 
Mid-States Club Hockey Association (MSCHA)
Mid America High School Hockey League (MAHSHL)
New Jersey State Interscholastic Athletic Association
New York high school hockey 
New York State Public High School Athletic Association (varsity)
New York State Amateur Hockey Association (non varsity)
North Dakota High School Activities Association
Northern Virginia Scholastic Hockey League
Ohio High School Athletic Association
Pennsylvania high school hockey
Penguins Cup 
Flyers Cup
Washington high school hockey
Western Washington High School Hockey League
Tri-Cities Amateur Hockey Association
West Virginia high school hockey (Penguins Cup)
Wisconsin high school hockey
Wisconsin Interscholastic Athletic Association
Wisconsin Amateur Hockey Association

Defunct leagues
All-American Hockey League (1987–1988)
All American Hockey League (2008–2011)
America East Hockey League (2005–2008)
Amateur Hockey Association of Canada (1886–1898)
American Amateur Hockey League (1896–1917)
American Hockey Association (1926–1942)
Atlantic Coast Hockey League (1981–87) (1981–1987)
Atlantic Coast Hockey League (2002–2003)
California Hockey League (1928–1933)
California Hockey League (1957–1963)
Canadian Amateur Hockey League (1899–1905)
Canadian–American Hockey League (1926–1936)
Canadian Elite Hockey League (2005–2006)
Canadian Hockey Association (1909–1910)
Canadian Independent Junior Hockey League (2014) (folded prior to playing any games)
Canadian International Hockey League (2014) - played one season
Canadian Premier Junior Hockey League (2016-2022)
Canadian Women's Hockey League (2007–2019)
Central Ontario Junior C Hockey League - (1970–2016) Became Orr Division of the PJHL
Canadian Professional Hockey League (1926–1930)
Central Collegiate Hockey Association (NCAA Division I, 1971–2013, but will be revived in 2021–22)
Central Hockey League (1963–1984)
Central Hockey League (1992–2014) (United States; Canada)
Central Ontario Hockey League (Unknown–1980)
Central Ontario Women's Hockey League (1992–1998)
Central West Junior Hockey League (relegated from Jr B 2014 and became inactive)
College Hockey America men's division (NCAA Division I, 1999–2010; conference remains in operation as a women's hockey league)
Coloured Hockey League (1895–1925)
Continental Elite Hockey League (2001–2004)
Continental Hockey League (1972–1987)–became All-American Hockey League
Eastern Amateur Hockey League (1933–1934, 1935–1948, 1949–1953)
Eastern Canada Amateur Hockey Association (1905–1909)
Eastern Canada Amateur Hockey League (1923–?)
Eastern Hockey League (1934–1935, 1954–1973, 1978–1981)
Eastern Junior Hockey League (1993–2013) – Some split from the league to form the United States Premier Hockey League and the remaining teams joined the Eastern Hockey League
Eastern Junior B Hockey League (1951–1972)
Eastern Ontario Senior Hockey League (2003–2008)
Eastern Professional Hockey League (2008–2009)
Eastern Professional Hockey League (1914–1915, 1959–1963)
Eastern States Hockey League (2003–2013) formerly the Continental Hockey Association 2003–2011
EJHL South (2006–2013) formerly the Southeastern Junior Hockey League, affiliated with the Eastern Junior Hockey League from 2011–2013 before merging with the United States Premier Hockey League as the Elite Division
Empire Junior Hockey League (–2013) – Merged with the United States Premier Hockey League as the Empire Division
Empire B Junior C Hockey League - (1989-2016) Became Tod Division of the PJHL
Federal Amateur Hockey League (1904–1909)
Georgian Mid-Ontario Junior C Hockey League - (19??-2016) Became Carruthers Division of the PJHL
Global Hockey League (DNP, 1990)
Great Lakes Junior Hockey League (2008-2012)
Great Lakes Junior C Hockey League - (1968-2016) Became Bill Stobbs Division of the PJHL
Great West Hockey Conference (NCAA Division I, 1985–1988)
Gulf Coast Hockey League (2001–2002)
International-American Hockey League (1936–1941)-became American Hockey League
International Independent Hockey League (2003)
International Hockey League (1929–36)
International Hockey League (1945–2001)
International Professional Hockey League (1904–1907)
Interprovincial Amateur Hockey Union (1908-1914)
Interprovincial Professional Hockey League (1910–1911)
Ligue Centrale de Hockey (1978–2008)
Ligue de Hockey Junior de Montréal 
Major Intermediate A Hockey League (1978–1983)
Manitoba Hockey Association (1907–1909) formerly the Manitoba Professional Hockey League and the Manitoba Hockey League
Maritime Major Hockey League (1950–1954)
Maritime Professional Hockey League (1911–1914)
Metro Atlantic Athletic Conference (NCAA Division I, 1997–2003; conference remains in operation as an all-sports league without ice hockey)
Metro Junior A Hockey League (1991–1998) merged with Ontario Provincial Junior A Hockey League
Metropolitan Junior Hockey League (1966–2017) played last season as the North American 3 Atlantic Hockey League (2016–17) and the remaining teams joined the Eastern Hockey League
Mid-Atlantic Hockey League (2007–2008)
Midwest Junior Hockey League (2012-2015) merged with United States Premier Hockey League
Midwestern Junior C Hockey League (2013-2016) Became Pat Doherty Division of the PJHL
Minnesota Junior Hockey League (1974-2015) merged with United States Premier Hockey League
National College Prospects Hockey League (2016–2017) – Folded after one season and was AAU sanctioned.
National Hockey Association (1909–1917)
National Women's Hockey League (1999-2007)
New York-Penn Major Hockey League (1973 to 1979)
Niagara & District Junior C Hockey League - (1974-2016) Became Bloomfield Division of the PJHL
North American 3 Eastern Hockey League (2014–2016) formerly the Northern States Hockey League (2012–2014) - merged with North American 3 Hockey League
North American Hockey League (1973–1977)
North Eastern Hockey League (2003–2008)
North of Superior Junior B Hockey League (1996-2004) (Canada)
North West Hockey League (1933–1936)
Northern Junior Hockey League (2008–2010) (2008 as United Junior Hockey League)
Northern Pacific Hockey League (2000–2016) - folded and remaining teams joined the United States Premier Hockey League
Northern States Junior Hockey League (2012–2014) - became the North American 3 Eastern Hockey League
Northwest Junior Hockey League (Manitoba) (1992-2004) (Canada)
Ontario Professional Hockey League (1907–1911, 1930–1931)
Original Stars Hockey League (2004)
Ottawa City Hockey League (1890–1957)
Pacific Coast Hockey Association (1911–1924)
Pacific Coast Hockey League (1928–1931, 1936–1941, 1945–1952)
Pacific Junior A Hockey League (1971–1979) (Canada)
Pacific Hockey League (1977–1979)
Pacific Hockey League (1994–1995)
Prairie Hockey League (1926–1928)
Quebec Hockey League (1952–1959)
Quebec Senior Hockey League (1945–1952)
Rocky Mountain Junior Hockey League aka Peace Cariboo Junior Hockey League (1975-1999) (British Columbia, Canada)
Rocky Mountain Junior Hockey League (2015–2018)
South East Hockey League (2003–2004)
Southern Elite Hockey League (1998–2000)
Southern Hockey League (1973–1977)
Southern Hockey League (1995–1996)
Southern Ontario Junior A Hockey League (1972–1976) merged with Ontario Provincial Junior A Hockey League
Southern Ontario Junior Hockey League (1960–2016) Became Yeck Division of the PJHL
Southwest Hockey League (1975–1977)
Sunshine Hockey League (1992–1995)
Tri-State Hockey League (1932–1933)
Tri-State League (NCAA Division I, 1950–1972)
Tropical Hockey League (1938–1939)
United Hockey League (1991 as Colonial Hockey League, also known as International Hockey League) (1991-2010)
United States Hockey League (1945–1951)
USA Central Hockey League (2018)
Western Canada Hockey League (professional) (1921–1925)
Western Canada Hockey League (minor pro) (1932–1933)
Western Canada Senior Hockey League (1945–1951)
Western Ontario Junior C Hockey League (1966-2016) formerly the Western Junior C Hockey League, the Central Junior "C" Hockey League and the Grey-Bruce Junior "C" Hockey League; Became Pollock Division of the PJHL
West Coast Hockey League (1995–2003)
Western Canada Hockey League (1925 as Western Hockey League) (1921–1926)
Western Hockey League (1952–1974) (1952–1974)
Western International Hockey League (1946–1962, 1963–1988)
Western Professional Hockey League (1996–2001)
Western States Hockey League (1994-2022)
Western Women's Hockey League (2004–2011)
World Hockey Association (1972–1979)
World Hockey Association 2 (2003–2004)
World United Hockey League (2014–2015)
WHA Junior Hockey League (2006–2008)

South America
Brazilian Ice Hockey Championship (2008–2010)

Argentina 
Copa Fin del Mundo

Africa
South Africa

Asia
Asia League Ice Hockey (Japan; Russia; South Korea) (multinational)

China
Chinese Ice Hockey Championship

Taiwan
Chinese Taipei Ice Hockey League

Hong Kong
Hong Kong Ice Hockey League

India
Indian Ice Hockey Championship

Indonesia
Indonesia Ice Hockey League

Israel
Israeli League

Japan
All-Japan Championship (amateur cup tournament)
All-Japan Women's Ice Hockey Championship (1982; amateur cup tournament)
Women's Japan Ice Hockey League (WJIHL; 2012)
Defunct
Japan Ice Hockey League

Iran
Iran Hockey Championship (league in both Europe and Asia)

Kuwait
Kuwait Hockey League

Kyrgyzstan
Kyrgyzstan Championship

Macau
Macau Ice Hockey League

Malaysia
Malaysia Ice Hockey League

Mongolia
Mongolia Hockey League

North Korea
North Korean Championship

Philippines
Philippine Hockey League
Philippine Minor Hockey League
Manila Ice Hockey League

Qatar
Qatar International Ice Hockey League

Singapore
Singapore National Ice Hockey League

Thailand
Thai World Hockey League

Turkmenistan
Turkmenistan Championship (2013)

United Arab Emirates
Emirates Ice Hockey League

Uzbekistan
Uzbekistan Hockey League

Eurasia
European Women's Hockey League - multinational league featuring teams from across Europe and Kazakhstan
Kontinental Hockey League (Belarus; China; Kazakhstan; Russia)
Supreme Hockey League (Kazakhstan; China; Russia; Uzbekistan)
Zhenskaya Hockey League (China; Russia)

Europe

Multinational
Active
Alps Hockey League - multinational league with teams from Austria, Italy and Slovenia.
Austrian Hockey League - multinational league with teams from Austria, Hungary, Italy, Slovakia, Slovenia and the Czech Republic.
Baltic Hockey League - multinational league with teams from Estonia, Latvia and Lithuania.
BeNe League - multinational league with teams in the Netherlands and Belgium.
Champions Hockey League - multinational league/competition featuring top teams from first-tier leagues across Europe.
Erste Liga - multinational league with teams from Hungary, Romania and Austria.
European Women's Hockey League - multinational league featuring teams from across Europe and Kazakhstan
Kontinental Hockey League - multinational league with teams from Russia, Belarus, China and Kazakhstan.
Tipsport liga - Slovak league with two teams from Hungary.
Defunct
Alpenliga (1991–1999) - multinational league with teams from Austria, Italy and Slovenia. Replaced by the International Ice Hockey League (1999–2007)
Champions Hockey League (2008–09)
Eastern European Hockey League (1995–2005) - multinational league with teams from Belarus, Latvia, Lithuania, Ukraine, Russia and Poland.
North Sea Cup (2010–2012) - temporary successor of the Eredivisie.
Panonian League (2002–2009) - multinational league with teams from Hungary, Romania, Croatia and Serbia.

Armenia
Armenian Hockey League

Austria

Men
Austrian Hockey League
Austrian National League (1959–2012)
Austrian Oberliga

Women
Austria women's ice hockey Bundesliga (DEBL)

Belarus
Belarusian Extraleague

Belgium
Defunct
Belgian Hockey League - merged with Eredivisie to form the BeNe League

Bosnia and Herzegovina
Bosnia and Herzegovina Hockey League

Bulgaria

Men
Bulgarian Hockey League

Women
Bulgarian Women's Hockey League

Croatia
Croatian Ice Hockey League

Czechoslovakia 

 Czechoslovak First Ice Hockey League (1936–1993)

Czech Republic
Czech Extraliga (1993)
Czech 1.liga
Czech 2.liga

Denmark
Metal Ligaen

East Germany
DDR-Oberliga

Estonia
Meistriliiga

Finland

Men
Liiga (1975; renamed from SM-liiga in 2013)
Mestis (renamed in 2000)
Suomi-sarja
2. Divisioona
Defunct
SM-sarja

Women
Naisten Liiga (1982; renamed from Naisten SM-sarja in 2017)
Naisten Mestis (renamed from I-divisoona in 2013)
Naisten Suomi-sarja

France

Men
Ligue Magnus
Division 1
Division 2
Division 3

Women
France women's ice hockey league

Georgia
Georgian Ice Hockey League

Germany

Men
German Ice Hockey League (DEL) (1994-)
Ice hockey Bundesliga (1958–1994, replaced by DEL)
DEL2 (2013-)
2nd Bundesliga (1973-2013, replaced by DEL2)
Oberliga (1948-)
Bavarian ice hockey leagues (1976-)
Regionalliga (1961-)

Women
German women's ice hockey Bundesliga (DFEL; 1988)

Greece
Greek Ice Hockey Championship

Hungary
OB I bajnokság

Iceland
Icelandic Hockey League

Ireland
Irish Ice Hockey League (2007-2010)

Italy

Semi-pro
Italian Hockey League - Serie A (former Serie A, Elite.A and Serie A1) - the teams playing the IHL - Serie A compete also in the Alps Hockey League 
Italian Hockey League (former  Serie B, Seconda Divisione and Serie A2)

Amateur
Italian Hockey League - Division I (former Serie C)

Junior and youth
Under 19 (1 national division)
Under 17 (1 national division)
Under 15 (2 national divisions)
Under 13 (many regional divisions)
Under 10 (many regional divisions)
Under 8 (many regional divisions)

Women
Italian Hockey League Women (former Serie A)

Latvia
Latvian Hockey Higher League

Amateur
Independent Amateur Hockey League (Neatkarīgā Amatieru hokeja līga/NAHL)

Lithuania
Lithuania Hockey League

Luxembourg
Luxembourg Championship (1993-2003)

The Netherlands
Eerste Divisie
Defunct
Eredivisie merged with Belgian Hockey League to form the BeNe League

Junior and youth
U17
U14
U12

Norway
GET-ligaen
1. divisjon
2. divisjon

Junior and youth
Norway U20 Elite
Norway U18 Elite

Poland
Polska Hokej Liga reorganized from Ekstraklasa and Polska Liga Hokejowa
Polish 1. Liga

Romania
Liga Naţională de hochei

Russia

Men

Major professional
Kontinental Hockey League

Minor professional
Supreme Hockey League

Semi-pro
Supreme Hockey League Championship

Junior
Junior Hockey League formerly the Minor Hockey League (Molodezhnaya Hokkeinaya Liga)
National Junior Hockey League formerly Minor (or Junior) Hockey League Division B

Youth
Moscow Region
Northwest Region Hockey
Ural Region

Amateur
Night Hockey League
Siberian Hockey League

Women
Zhenskaya Hockey League (2015)

Defunct
Russian Superleague (1996–2008)
International Hockey League (1992–96)
Vysshaya Liga (1992–2010)
Russian Second League

Serbia
Serbian Hockey League

Slovakia
Tipsport liga (1993–present after dissolution of Czechoslovakia. Czechoslovak First Ice Hockey League (1931–1993))
Slovak 1. Liga (12 teams, first 8 participate in play-offs and the winner plays with the worst team from Extraliga, last four teams participate in a play-out and 4th team after play-out plays a relegation game with the best team in 2.Liga)
Slovak 2. Liga

Slovenia
Slovenian Ice Hockey League

Soviet Union
Soviet Championship League played last season as the CIS Championship (1992)

Spain

Men
Liga Nacional de Hockey Hielo

Women
Liga Nacional de Hockey Hielo Femenino

Sweden

Men
Swedish Hockey League (New name for the top league in 2013. The national championship has been played since 1922 in other forms. 14 teams.)
HockeyAllsvenskan (The Swedish second league. The teams compete for a spot in the next season of SHL. 14 teams.)
Hockeyettan, Division 1 (Divided into 4 regions: North, East, West, and South. The five best teams in each region make 2 new series called Allettan at the conclusion of the regions. The two Allettan winners, and the two teams that survive a three-round playoff, compete with the last two teams in HockeyAllsvenskan for their spots in the higher league. 40 teams at present. This is the lowest tier organised nationally.)
Hockeytvåan (Divided into 9 regions.)
Hockeytrean (Divided into 14 regions.)
Hockeyfyran (Divided into 7 regions. The league does not cover all of Sweden.)
Division 5 (Divided into 2 regions, both in Stockholm.)

Junior and youth
J20 SuperElit (Under 20, junior league.)
J20 Elit (Under 20, junior second league. Divided into 4 regions: North, East, West, and South.)
J18 Elit (Under 18, divided into 4 regions.)

Women
Swedish Women's Hockey League (SDHL; 8 teams) formerly named Riksserien
Damettan

Switzerland

Men
National League (1908)
Swiss League
MySports League (new league, created in 2017, between the Swiss League and the 1. Liga)

Amateur
Regio League
1. Liga
2. Liga

Women
Switzerland women's ice hockey league

Turkey 
(Leagues involve teams from both Europe and Asia) 
Turkish Ice Hockey Super League (1993)
Turkish Ice Hockey First League (2005)
Turkish Ice Hockey Women's League (2007)

Ukraine
Ukrainian Hockey League

Junior
Junior Hockey League (2012)

Defunct
Major League (1992-2011)
Professional Hockey League (2011–2013)
Ukrainian Hockey Extra League (2015–2016)

United Kingdom
Elite Ice Hockey League (2003–present)
National Ice Hockey League (1996–present)
Scottish National League
British Universities Ice Hockey Association (2003-present)

Defunct leagues
British National League (1954–1960)
British National League (1996–2005)
Ice Hockey Superleague (1996–2003)
British Hockey League (1982–1996)
English Premier Ice Hockey League (1997–2017)

English Ice Hockey Association Women's Leagues
Women's Elite League
Women's Premier League
Women's Division 1 North
Women's Division 1 South

West Germany
Eishockey-Bundesliga

Yugoslavia
Yugoslav Ice Hockey League

Oceania

Australia

Men
Australian Ice Hockey League (Semi-professional)
Pacific Hockey League (Semi-professional)
East Coast Super League (2nd tier)
National Hockey Super League (Professional)

Junior
Australian Junior Ice Hockey League

Women
Australian Women's Ice Hockey League

New Zealand
New Zealand Ice Hockey League (amateur)

Disabled hockey leagues
Leagues for disabled hockey players:
Amputee Hockey
American Amputee Hockey Association (AAHA)
American Hearing Impaired Hockey Association
Ice sledge hockey
United States Sled Hockey Association (USSHA)
Mid-American Great Lakes Hockey League (MAGL)
Special Hockey
Special Hockey International – Representing hockey programs for developmentally challenged athletes from around the world, SHI stages an annual tournament that is the largest of its kind in the world.

References

 
Leagues
Ice hockey